Selena is a feminine given name, a probable variant of Selene, the goddess and personification of the Moon in Greek mythology and religion. 

People with the name include:

 Selena (Selena Quintanilla-Pérez; 1971–1995), Mexican-American singer
 Selena (Dutch singer) (Selena Brons; born 1965), Dutch singer
 Selena Sloan Butler (1872–1964) American founder and president of parent-teacher organizations
 Selena Coppa (born 1983), military intelligence Sergeant in the United States Army
 Selena Cuffe (born 1975), American businesswoman
 Selena Forrest (born 1999), American fashion model
 Selena Fox (born 1949), Wiccan priestess and activist
 Selena Gomez (born 1992), American singer and actress
 Selena Li (born 1981), Hong Kong actress and beauty contestant
 Selena Millares (born 1963), Spanish writer and professor
 Selena Milošević (born 1989), Croatian handball player
 Selena Piek (born 1991), Dutch badminton player
 Selena Roberts (born 1966), American sponsors and sportswriter
 Selena Royle (1904–1983), American actress
 Selena M. Salcedo, American soldier convicted of assaulting an Afghan prisoner who later died
 Selena Tan, Singaporean actress

Fictional characters
Selena, a character in the film 28 Days Later

See also
 Selina, given name
 Serena (disambiguation)

Notes

English feminine given names